Viareggio railway station serves the city and comune of Viareggio, in the region of Tuscany, central Italy.  Opened in 1936, it forms part of the Pisa–La Spezia–Genoa railway, and is also a junction for a regional line to Florence.

The station is currently managed by Rete Ferroviaria Italiana (RFI).  Train services to and from the station are operated by Trenitalia.  Each of these companies is a subsidiary of Ferrovie dello Stato (FS), Italy's state-owned rail company.

Thanks to its position, the station is the most significant one in the Province of Lucca. It is an important junction connecting Pisa, Livorno and Rome with La Spezia, Genoa, Parma and Milan, and providing interchange for passengers to and from all of these cities with trains to and from Lucca, Florence and the Garfagnana. Its catchment area includes much of the Versilia.

Location
Viareggio railway station is situated in Piazzale Dante Alighieri, at the western edge of the city centre.

History
The original Viareggio station was opened in 1861.  By the end of the nineteenth century, it was inadequate for the role of trade and tourism that the city was taking at that time. As early as 1889, the comune of Viareggio had proposed the construction of a new, more central, facility, that could provide "more prestige and dignity to the city."

The present station was opened on 13 June 1936, in the presence of Minister of Communications Antonio Stefano Benni. The passenger building was designed by the prolific railway station architect Roberto Narducci, while its construction was entrusted to the company "Ignesti Federico e Figli".

Derailment in 2009

On 29 June 2009, shortly before midnight, freight train no. 50 325 from Trecate to Gricignano derailed near the station, causing the explosion of a tank carrying LPG, the collapse of some houses nearby and the deaths of 32 people.

The section of line between Forte dei Marmi-Seravezza-Querceta and Pisa San Rossore was closed to ordinary traffic until 3 July 2009, when repairs were completed to track damaged by the explosion.

Features

The passenger building has a ticket counter, ticket machines, a police station, a bar, and a kiosk.  In the square in front of the building is a bus stop for buses and taxis.

The station yard has eight loop tracks.  Originally there were ten, but two of them were removed in the aftermath of the 2009 derailment.  The four platforms at the station are covered by canopies and connected with each other by a pedestrian underpass.  The station also has many monitors showing in real time where and when trains are leaving and arriving.

Track 1 is used for terminating trains, and Track 2 is for passing freight trains.  Track 3 is used by through trains from Pisa Centrale, and Track 4 by direct trains to Pisa.  Tracks 5 and 6 are used as the terminus of the Viareggio–Florence railway via Lucca, and Tracks 7 and 8 as a terminus for trains to and from Lucca.

About  towards Pisa is the Viareggio Scalo goods yard, now disused.

Passenger and train movements
The station is served by numerous trains: regional, express, InterCity and even a pair of Eurostar City trains.

Interchange
There is interchange at the station with urban and suburban bus lines.

See also

History of rail transport in Italy
List of railway stations in Tuscany
Rail transport in Italy
Railway stations in Italy

References

External links

This article is based upon a translation of the Italian language version as at February 2011.

Railway Station
Railway stations in Tuscany
Railway stations opened in 1936